"The Saint" is a song from the British pop duo Thompson Twins, which was released in 1992 as the second single from eighth studio album Queer. The song was written and produced by Tom Bailey and Alannah Currie.

"The Saint" was originally distributed to DJs on white label before receiving a single release by Warner. In addition to its success on the UK dance and club scene, the single reached number 53 in the UK Singles Chart and remained in the top 100 for two weeks.

Critical reception
Upon its release as a single, James Hamilton, writing for the Record Mirror update in Music Week, described "The Saint" as a "Alannah Currie cooed and Tom Bailey muttered mushily churning chugger". He described the "Feedback Max Remix" as "sombre piano plonked", the "Feedback Max Hard Groove" as "synth washed", the "LP Version" as "guitar yowled bounc[y] pop" and noted that David Morales' remixes were "more sparsely throbbing". Terry Staunton of NME stated, "Gone are the days of the poorly drawn cartoon pop and Alannah Currie's silly hats. Instead, the Thommos are now dabbling in House styles and not making that bad a job of it. True to form, nobody has a bloody clue what they're on about, but if this was a little less wishy-washy it could pass for anything on the Saint Etienne album." Accrington Observer gave a three out of five star rating and wrote, "It begins with Enigma-ish synths, Alannah has a few breathy vocals and Tom repeats 'I'm praying to the saint of the groove' numerous times. In spite of this I have a feeling it could be a hit."

Formats

Personnel
Credits are adapted from UK/European CD single liner notes.

Production
 Tom Bailey, Alannah Currie – producers
 Keith Fernley – engineer
 Feedback Max – additional production and remixes ("Feedback Max Remix" and "Feedback Max Hard Groove")
 David Morales – additional production and remixes ("Def Sonic 12" Mix", "Red Zone Dub" and "8th Street Dub")
 Henry Binns – mixing assistant on "LP Version"

Other
 Mike Owen – photography 
 Matt Maitland – sleeve

Charts

References

1991 songs
1992 singles
Warner Records singles
Thompson Twins songs
Songs written by Alannah Currie
Songs written by Tom Bailey (musician)